Hyundai Motor India Ltd is a wholly owned subsidiary of the Hyundai Motor Company headquartered in South Korea. It is the second largest automobile manufacturer with 15% market share as of 2022 and US$5.5 billion turn-over in India.

History
Hyundai Motor India Limited was formed on 6 May 1996 by the Hyundai Motor Company of South Korea. When Hyundai Motor Company entered the Indian automobile market in 1996 the Hyundai brand was almost unknown throughout India. During the entry of Hyundai in 1996, there were only five major automobile manufacturers in India, i.e. Maruti, Hindustan, Premier, Tata and Mahindra. Daewoo had entered the Indian automobile market with Cielo just three years back while Ford, Opel and Honda had entered less than a year back.

For more than a decade till Hyundai arrived, Maruti Suzuki had a near monopoly over the passenger cars segment because Tata Motors and Mahindra & Mahindra were solely utility and commercial vehicle manufacturers, while Hindustan and Premier both built outdated and uncompetitive products.

HMIL's first car, the Hyundai Santro was launched on 23 September 1998 and was a runaway success. Within a few months of its inception, HMIL became India's second-largest automobile manufacturer and the largest automobile exporter. Hyundai Motor India Limited (HMIL) is a wholly-owned subsidiary of Hyundai Motor Company (HMC), South Korea and is the largest passenger car exporter and the second largest car manufacturer in India.

Hyundai started the construction of the plant in the year 1996. December 10th 1996 the groundbreaking ceremony was done for Plant 1. Mr Yang Soo Kim was then the Managing Director of Hyundai Motor India. 

The Indian counterpart leadership team was managed by Mr AP Gandhi, Mr BVR Subbu and Mr G.S. Ramesh. Mr AP Gandhi was the president for a few years of inception. Mr BVR Subbu was the marketing director responsible for dealer development and sales. He resigned from Hyundai Motor India in 2006.

HMC has set up a research and development facility (Hyundai Motor India Engineering – HMIE) in the cyber city of Hyderabad.

As HMC's global export hub for compact cars, HMIL is the first automotive company in India to achieve the export of 10 lakh cars in just over a decade. HMIL currently exports cars to more than 87 countries. It has been the number one exporter of passenger cars in the country for the eighth year in a row.

To support its growth and expansion plans, HMIL currently has a strong 1200 dealer network and more than 1,309 strong service points across India.

In July 2012, Arvind Saxena, the Director of Marketing and Sales stepped down from the position after serving the company for seven years.

In August 2018, Rakesh Srivastava, Director of Sales and Marketing at Hyundai India, resigned from his position after serving for six years.

On 4 December 2018, Hyundai Motor India Ltd, announced the top-level management changes immediately. Seon Seob Kim assumed the responsibilities of MD and CEO from Young Key Koo.

In 2019, Hyundai Motor Company invested around 1.1 trillion KRW in an additional EV production line and began manufacturing Kona Electric. 

In 2022, Hyundai Motor India Limited receives about 85% of its electrical power as eco-friendly energy from external power plants. Moreover, it is currently installing a stationary solar power system of 1.9MWp using the module factory’s roof with a size of 13,028m².

Manufacturing facilities
HMIL has two manufacturing plants in Irungattukottai and Sriperumbudur in Tamil Nadu. HMIL's manufacturing plant near Chennai claims to have the most advanced production, quality and testing capabilities in the country. To cater to rising demand, HMIL commissioned its second plant in February 2008, which produces an additional 300,000 units per annum, raising HMIL's total production capacity to 600,000 units per annum. Current Production Capacity efficiency, has led to rolling out cars in 31 seconds, with these two plants in Irungattukottai , Sriperumbudur increased to 7,40,000 cars per year.

R&D centre
Hyundai Motor India Engineering (HMIE) is a fully owned subsidiary of Hyundai Motor Company, South Korea, which is located at Hyderabad, Telangana. HMIL established HMIE in November 2006 and contributed to the development of Hyundai Motors' popular new models for the Indian market starting with the Eon and followed now by the "i" series, and also in SUV segments like the Creta. Hyundai Motors' other overseas R&D centres are located in the United States, Germany, Japan, Korea, and China.

Regional headquarters

As of 2 July 2018, as part of organizational restructuring, Hyundai has announced the creation of three regional headquarters – Hyundai Motor India, Hyundai Motor North America and Hyundai Motor Europe. The regional headquarters will have various divisions for planning, finance, products and customer experience. They will work in collaboration with Hyundai Motor Company – the corporate headquarters based in Seoul, South Korea.

Hyundai Motor India led by SS Kim will oversee the operations of the brand in the regional market.

Global Quality Centre

Indian Quality Centre (INQC) is one of five quality centres worldwide, along with those in the US, China, Europe and Middle East.

The India centre located at Faridabad, Haryana will conduct durability studies of existing models and benchmark parts and systems for constant improvement.

The key activity of the centre is to "contribute in new car development from pilot stage to create quality product with zero defect".

The centre will also be responsible for ensuring "top level safety quality" through proactive customer oriented management system and understanding feedback from them to eliminate potential risks. The centre also has an objective to study market conditions and other Asia Pacific regions to develop new cars and adapt strategies for continuous product quality improvement.

The company opened a training centre at the facility. It will have its own body and paint unit. The new service training will ensure overall skill development of entire service profile of dealer manpower.

Models

Current models

Discontinued models  

 Hyundai Santro (September 23 1998–2014, 2018–2022)
 Hyundai Accent (October 14 1999–2013)
 Hyundai Sonata (July 18 2001–2014)
 Hyundai Terracan (August 4 2003–2007)
 Hyundai Elantra (April 15 2004–2022)
 Hyundai Getz (September 10 2004–2009)
 Hyundai Santa Fe (October 13 2010–2017)
 Hyundai Eon (2011–2019)
 Hyundai Xcent (2014–2020)

Sales and service network
HMIL has 475 dealers and more than 1,300 service points across India.  HMIL also operates its own dealerships known as Hyundai Motor Plazas in large metros across India. HMIL has the second largest sales and service network in India after Maruti Suzuki.

Sales and exports 

HMIL currently exports vehicles to over 92 countries across Africa, Middle East, Latin America, Australia and Asia. It has been India's number one exporter for the last 10 years consecutively.

In February 2010 HMIL achieved a record export of 1 million units.

 HMIL has been consecutively awarded "Top Exporter Of The Year" for 10 years by EEPC.The Highest Exported volume was 2,70,017 in year 2009. Now, it has moved down as fourth largest car exporter following Maruti Suzuki, Volkswagen and Nissan.

Awards and achievements
Indian Car of the Year (ICOTY)
2008 — Hyundai i10
2014 — Hyundai Grand i10
2015 — Hyundai Elite i20
2016 — Hyundai Creta
2018 — Hyundai Verna 
2020 — Hyundai Venue
2021 - Hyundai i20
J D Power Appeal Awards 2016 demonstrating excellence of 'Made In India' Products as per global standards for Grand i10, Elite i20 & Creta.
JD Power Indian Customer Satisfaction Award 2017 – For Ranking Number 1 in After Sales Customer satisfaction.

Brand ambassador
The carmaker got Shah Rukh Khan on board as its brand ambassador for the Hyundai Xcent, the company's recently launched sub-compact sedan in India. 1998, SRK shot his first TVC for the Hyundai Santro, and his association with the car brand has now turned 23.

In 2010 Khan won the "Brand Ambassador of the Year" for Hyundai i10 at NDTV Profit Car and Bike Awards.

Khan also promotes the "Be The Better Guy" road safety campaign for Hyundai.

In July 2017, Hyundai India extended Khan's contract for two years.

Hyundai Motor India Foundation 
In 2021, the Hyundai Motor India Foundation (HMIF), the philanthropic arm of Hyundai Motor India Ltd., announced a new initiative, Art for Hope. It will work towards encouraging artists across various domains like digital arts, crafts, multidisciplinary arts, performance arts and visual arts. The project is scheduled to begin October 2021. Selected artists will get an opportunity to exchange ideas, complete an art project and be mentored by key industry people. The final projects will be displayed in art shows across India.

See also
 Hyundai Motor Company
 Hyundai Kia Automotive Group
 Automotive industry in India
 List of Hyundai Motor Company manufacturing facilities

References

External links
Hyundai Motor India Limited

India
Car manufacturers of India
Manufacturing companies based in Chennai
Vehicle manufacturing companies established in 1996
Indian subsidiaries of foreign companies
1996 establishments in Tamil Nadu